Antakya is the capital of Hatay Province, the southernmost province of Turkey.

Antakya may also refer to:
 Antakya minnow